Uru Pa In may be,

Uru Pa In people
Uru Pa In language

Language and nationality disambiguation pages